Captain Atom is a superhero appearing in American comic books, first in the 1960s by Charlton Comics before being acquired in the 1980s by DC Comics. Captain Atom has existed in three basic incarnations.

Publication history
Captain Atom was created by writer Joe Gill and artist/co-writer Steve Ditko, and first appeared in Space Adventures #33 (March 1960). Captain Atom was initially created for Charlton Comics, but was later acquired by DC Comics and revised for DC's Post-Crisis continuity. In 2011, DC Comics relaunched its superhero comics and rewrote the histories of some characters from scratch, including Captain Atom, giving him a new origin, appearance and slightly altered powers. Captain Atom was the character inspiration for Doctor Manhattan, who was featured in the miniseries (and later live-action film adaptation) Watchmen, which would be connected to the DC Universe in the miniseries Doomsday Clock.

Throughout the years, the character has been featured in several moderate-to-short-lived eponymous series, and has been a member of several different versions of DC's flagship superhero team, the Justice League. In all incarnations, the character initially served for the military. In the Charlton Comics continuity, he was a scientist named Allen Adam and gained his abilities by accident when he was seemingly "atomized" and then his body reformed, now existing as an atomic-powered being. In both DC Comics incarnations, he is an Air Force pilot named Nathaniel Adam, who was a test subject in a scientific experiment who seemingly disintegrated in the process, only to reappear later as the super-powered Captain Atom. Over the years, DC has attempted to reinvent the character several times. For a period, the character assumed the mantle of the supervillain Monarch, and in 2005 DC attempted to retell the Captain Atom story with an entirely new character, Breach, who was subsequently discarded. In the new continuity following DC's 2011 relaunch, Captain Atom has never been a member of the Justice League and the team views him with distrust; his character origin and abilities were also revised.

Captain Atom has appeared in several animated television and film adaptations of Justice League and other DC storylines since the mid-2000s, where he is depicted as a powerful member of the Justice League whose abilities place him roughly on par with the franchise's flagship character Superman. In several animated depictions, he has served the role as a government stooge when the government has brought itself into conflict with the Justice League.

Fictional character biography

Charlton Comics (Silver Age)

The Charlton Comics version of Captain Atom was Allen Adam. The character's origin had Adam working as a technician in a special experimental rocket when it accidentally launched with him trapped inside. Adam was atomized when the rocket exploded while entering the upper atmosphere. However, he somehow gained superpowers that included the ability to reform his body safely on the ground. He was outfitted in a red and yellow costume that was designed to shield people from the radiation of his nuclear powers. When he powered up, his hair changed to a silvery-white.

Later, in his own title, he replaced his original red and gold costume with a liquid-metal outfit that was under his skin and which transformed when he powered up. Captain Atom's powers were similar to such other nuclear-powered superheroes as Gold Key's Doctor Solar and Dell Comics' Nukla. Captain Atom was first published in a series of short stories in the anthology series Space Adventures #33–40 (March 1960 – June 1961) and #42 (October 1961). Charlton began reprinting his short adventures in the anthology Strange Suspense Stories beginning with issue #75 (June 1965), renaming the title Captain Atom with issue #78 (December 1965) and giving the hero full-length stories and supervillain antagonists such as Dr. Spectro (previous stories involved Cold War anti-Communist missions or dealing with aliens). Captain Atom later teamed with the superhero Nightshade, with whom he shared a mutual attraction. The superhero the Blue Beetle starred in the initial back-up feature, later replaced by a Nightshade back-up series.

Captain Atom was cancelled with issue #89 (December 1967). In 1975, the unfinished Ditko art for issue #90 was inked by John Byrne and published in the first two issues of the official Charlton fanzine, Charlton Bullseye, as the 10-page "Showdown in Sunuria" (writer: Jon G. Michels) and the 11-page "Two Against Sunuria" (writer: Roger Stern). Captain Atom next appeared in issue #7 (May 1982) of the new-talent showcase comic also called Charlton Bullseye, in a story by writer Benjamin Smith and artist/co-writer Dan Reed, which for some reason returned him to his original red and yellow outfit. The character's last pre-DC appearance was in AC Comics' one-shot issue Americomics Special #1 (August 1983), in a story teaming the Charlton "Action Heroes" the Blue Beetle, Captain Atom, Nightshade and the Question as the Sentinels of Justice. This last story had originally been done for Charlton before the company folded.

The actual Charlton characters made their first reappearance in DC's Crisis on Infinite Earths, which introduced Earth-Four as the native reality of Captain Atom and the world where all the Charlton Comics adventures had taken place. By story's end, Earth-Four (and the Charlton characters) had been incorporated into the Post-Crisis DC Universe, its history merging with that of the mainstream reality. The last appearance of this Charlton-era Captain Atom was in DC Comics Presents #90 (February 1986).

DC Comics (Post-Crisis)

A new Post-Crisis version of the character was introduced in March 1987 with the launch of a monthly comic written by Cary Bates (long-time writer of The Flash and Superman), co-written by Greg Weisman and drawn by Pat Broderick.

This modern captain's name is established as Nathaniel Christopher Adam, a United States Air Force officer and Vietnam War veteran. Adam had been framed for a crime and was, under military justice, condemned to death; this taking place under the purview of Col. Wade Eiling in the year 1968. As an alternative to execution, Adam was "asked" to participate in 'Project: Captain Atom', a military experiment with a slim chance of survival. He agreed to this in exchange for an unconditional presidential pardon. The experiment involved testing the hull of a crashed alien ship's durability by placing a human being (Adam) within the metal craft and then exploding an atomic weapon under it. The weapon went off and Adam was seemingly disintegrated. Eighteen years later, Adam suddenly reappeared. The alien metal, now bonded around his body, afforded him incredible abilities far beyond that of a mere mortal. Bonded with the metal, Nathaniel Adam now had powers that resulted from the metal's ability to tap into the "Quantum Field". It was revealed that the alien metal could absorb energy but only past a certain threshold, any excess absorption would force it to jump forward in time based on the amount of energy obtained.

Flung into the year 1986, Adam becomes literally a "man out of time". Wade Eiling is now a military general and the second husband of Adam's now-deceased wife Angela. Everyone had assumed that Nathaniel Adam died the day of the experiment, so his presidential pardon was never issued and the current government refused to acknowledge the previous pardon. Seizing the opportunity at hand, Eiling uses the outstanding murder/treason charges against Adam to blackmail him into acting as a military-controlled, government-sanctioned superhero codenamed Captain Atom. The events of the Charlton stories are used cleverly by Bates as a readymade, fabricated past to convince the world that Adam had secretly been a superhero for years enabling him to quickly gain the trust and reputation as an unsung patriot and hero. For his non-superhero activities, Nathaniel uses the alias Cameron Scott, an Air Force intelligence operative. During this time he meets the superpowered terrorist, Plastique, a recurring part of Nathaniel's life. Early conflicts involve him coming to terms with the lost time he missed with his now grown children, the death of his wife, her marriage to Eiling, and the overall ramifications of his newly acquired powers. Later, he learns that Project Atom, a secret government funded group that used new experimental machines to harness powerful energies had repeated the same process and created the supervillain Major Force, a bloodthirsty madman lacking Captain Atom's morality and classic military/A.F. discipline.

Atom/Adam serves under Eiling reluctantly while befriending research scientist Doctor Heinrich Megala of Project Atom, who had previously helped to create an elaborate cover story for Atom/Adam. Doctor Megala is responsible for creating the X-Ionizer technology capable of cutting the skin of most invulnerable metahumans. In spite of his disabilities and poor health, he helped Atom/Adam learn about the Quantum Field as well as about his powers. Captain Atom later succeeds in clearing his name of the original treason charge and eventually rebels against Eiling, resigning from the Air Force and becoming an actual superhero. By Captain Atom #39, Megala's health would deteriorate to a point where he asked Captain Atom for help and attempted to use his atomic energy to neutralize the life threatening disease he is suffering from, but becomes blinded as a side effect. Fearing that Eiling would eventually turn on him, Megala claims that he intends to set up a contingency plan which would make public all of Project Atom's classified secrets once his heart ceased to function. Megala's plan proved to be a mere bluff when he is killed in a confrontation with the Ghost a.k.a. Alec Rois, but Captain Atom decides to become the actual whistleblower and discloses the truth on national television.

Captain Atom joins the Justice League at the request of the U.S. government, eventually serving as leader of Justice League Europe. During his career, he has a brief romance with Catherine Cobert, develops a friendly "rivalry" with Firestorm (whose nickname is "the Nuclear Man"), becomes involved with and eventually marries Plastique (ironically, a one-time Firestorm foe), learns basic heroics from Batman when he briefly loses access to the Quantum Field, and commands the metahuman forces during the "Invasion" storyline where Earth was under attack by an alliance of alien forces. Captain Atom was canceled as of issue #57 in 1991 because Atom was slated to become the hero-turned-villain Monarch in DC's Armageddon 2001 crossover event; however, when word of this leaked out, DC changed the ending at the last minute. Atom and the Monarch character continue battling through time in Armageddon: The Alien Agenda limited series, until he is returned to his own time at the conclusion. Captain Atom then returns to the League, involved in the Zero Hour Crisis in 1994, founding an offshoot team, Extreme Justice in 1995. While leading Extreme Justice, Captain Atom comes across another version of Monarch, this one claiming to be the real Nathaniel Adam. Later in 1999, he is a member of the poorly received team known as the Living Assault Weapons or L.A.W., the members of whom are all previously Charlton Comics characters. In 2003, he again teams up with several former members of the Justice League as the "Super Buddies" in the humorous limited series Formerly Known as the Justice League. Around this time, various stories reintroduce Atom's conflict between his role in the superhero community and his responsibilities as a government agent.

At some point, Atom's marriage to Plastique ends in divorce. Apart from a brief mention of her at the beginning of L.A.W., the marriage appears to be forgotten. Plastique has reappeared in 2006 as a villainess again, undoing her reformation into a heroine. A later confirmation is brought in by the Captain Atom: Armageddon miniseries in which, after falling in love with Angela Spica of the Authority, Captain Atom reminisces about his short marriage with Plastique, and attributes their divorce to their irreconcilable views about world and politics, since Nathaniel, even in his spousal life, could not stop being a loyal soldier of the U.S., and Plastique could not simply put aside her life as a terrorist.

Later in 2003, writer Jeph Loeb returns Captain Atom to his roots as he went back to work for the government, this time for President Lex Luthor in the first story arc of the Superman/Batman series. Atom seemingly sacrifices his life to save Superman and Earth by piloting a starship to destroy a kryptonite meteor, but as it had previously been established that this type of accident could not kill him, he soon returns to life and to the background of the DC Universe. In a 2005 issue of Superman/Batman, it is made clear that Captain Atom survived the collision with the kryptonite meteor, but has absorbed massive amounts of radiation and become a super villain described as a "Kryptonite Man". The radiation is siphoned out of Captain Atom using a device made by Hiro Okamura, the new Toyman, which returns Captain Atom to his usual self (if somewhat confused).

"Armageddon" and WorldStorm
In 2005/2006, Captain Atom appears in a nine-part limited series entitled Captain Atom: Armageddon under DC's Wildstorm imprint. Captain Atom's sacrifice in Superman/Batman sends him to the WildStorm universe for the duration of the series. In this title, he wears a yellow/red outfit that was first seen in the 1996 Kingdom Come limited series.

At the moment of his apparent death, Captain Atom experiences a time-shift coinciding with his 2005 appearance in Superman/Batman, resulting in his arrival in the Wildstorm Universe. He quickly gets into a fight with an overzealous Mister Majestic and the fight ends with Majestic soundly defeated. Seeing the frightened reactions of onlookers, and puzzling over his own altered appearance, he realizes that he has somehow become trapped on an alternate Earth, one where superheroes are feared by the general populace. Mistaken by the local superheroes as the force destined to destroy their universe, he is in fact an instrument used ultimately by Nikola Hanssen, new host for half the essence of the Void, to reclaim her whole power (partially lodged in his own body, and cause of his altered appearance) and use it to trigger the reboot of the WildStorm universe, in the WorldStorm event.

Monarch

Captain Atom returns to the DC Universe in Infinite Crisis #7 when Superboy-Prime punctured
Breach, who wields similar energy-manipulating abilities. The end of Armageddon has him reappear in the devastated Blüdhaven. A year later, Captain Atom is revealed to be contained inside Blüdhaven and used to administer radiation treatments to metahumans. Apparently Void, able to finally let him go home, is unable to ensure his safety, and multiple damages to his radiation-shielding skin had left him comatose and unable to keep down his body radiation to safe levels; this forces the Atomic Knights to keep him constantly contained. In 2008's Countdown #8, it is learned that these ruptures were caused as part of a greater plan by Solomon the Monitor, in his plans to "recreate the Monarch" as part of a larger scheme to force the assimilation of the other Monitors.

After being fitted with an updated version of the Monarch armor (Armageddon 2001) to contain his radiation, the Captain awakens. Seeming to be mentally unstable, he breaks free, apparently kills the rampaging Major Force, and then releases a vast amount of energy, obliterating what was left of Blüdhaven. He remains missing until Kyle Rayner, then known as Ion, discovers him in The Bleed, a place between dimensions. The Captain indicates that he is traveling through The Bleed to operate outside the gaze of the Monitors. He discusses his time in the Wildstorm Universe, and his desire to visit other alternate worlds.

Countdown

In the last panel of Countdown #45, Monarch is shown observing Forerunner. The following issue, Countdown #44, bears a cover by Ed Benes with the Monarch armor and features Monarch swaying Forerunner to his side, turning her against the Monitors. Monarch argues that the Monitors are genocidal overlords who must be defeated; however, the Monitors assert that Monarch is a supervillain whose plan is to cause a Multiversal war that will leave him the ruler of the unified Earth remaining in its wake. Monarch creates an army of foot soldiers, including the Extremists of Earth-8, the JL-Axis of Earth-10, and the Crime Society of Earth-3, and disposes of Forerunner when he reveals his plans for a multiversal arena tournament.

The four-issue miniseries Countdown: Arena features Monarch battling alternate versions of characters throughout the Multiverse to compile the strike team for his new Multiverse army, specifically one Superman, one Batman, a Wonder Woman, a Green Lantern, a Flash, a Blue Beetle, a Nightshade, a Starman, and a Ray. Monarch's behavior becomes increasingly violent, notably in the form of his killing all residents of the Eve of Shadows' country in retribution for her attempt to violate the Monarch's rule of "no escaping". Monarch is now paranoid, and unwilling to share details of his past to his "subordinates", but the Red Son Superman and Liberty Files Batman discern that under the Monarch armor lies another Captain Atom, and so they employ his other counterparts—Breach (Tim Zanetti) and Quantum-Storm (Ronnie Raymond)—to assemble an army of Captain Atoms from the different dimensions to fight back. In Arenas conclusion, Monarch reveals that Breach is his brainwashed accomplice and that he has lured his 51 counterparts to murder them and absorb their power. With his team of Eve of Shadows (Earth-13), Vampire Batman (Earth-43), Ray "the Ray" Palmer (Earth-6), the monstrous Scarab (Earth-26), Hal Jordan Jr. (Earth-12), Starwoman (Earth-7), Johnny Quick (Earth-3), Wonder Woman (Earth-34), Red Son Superman (Earth-30), and himself—the sum power of 52 Captain Atoms—Monarch believes he is ready to confront the Monitors, and does so, finally launching his war on Earth-51 against the exposed Monitors.

In a protracted fight against Superman-Prime, his suit is damaged, releasing a chain reaction that apparently destroys the entire universe of Earth-51 aside from its Monitor. It was later learned that the Monitor Solomon had attacked Captain Atom in Blüdhaven, rupturing his skin and setting into motion his transformation into Monarch.

Project 7734
During Jimmy Olsen's investigation about Project 7734, the secret black-op commanded by Sam Lane to fight extraterrestrial menaces on Earth (including Kryptonians), it is discovered that an amnesiac and brainwashed Captain Atom is now one of the prized possessions of Sam Lane. Project Breach refers to his capture and brainwashing into a weapon (with Lane wanting to stress the similarities between Adam and Tim Zanetti) or Planet Breaker. Captain Atom refers to his name and rank as "Codename: Captain Atom".

Captain Atom returns in a co-feature in Action Comics #879 and appears in his normal costume instead of the Monarch armor he was last seen wearing. He is shown to reside in a mystical, medieval-reminiscent realm, attacking a highly fortified castle for unknown reasons other than, as he states, "his mission". After obliterating the castle's defenses, he has a brief flashback to a moment with the Justice League, then falls to the ground disoriented. No explanation is given for his return to his original appearance, his whereabouts since Countdown to Final Crisis, or why he has reverted to his heroic persona rather than that of the conquest-seeking Monarch. In Action Comics #880 it is revealed that Captain Atom has little or no memory of who he is other than his name. It is revealed that this mysterious realm is connected to Project 7734 and is part of his conditioning. Later, he is attacked by Major Force, an enemy believed to have been destroyed by Captain Atom himself when he first became Monarch. Mon-El appears and helps Captain Atom escape, taking him to the Justice League's satellite, where the League members declare that they are going to bring him to justice for his actions as Monarch. After a struggle with the League, Captain Atom tells them what he can remember. The League reminds him he was a hero who once saved the planet. He feels he has changed from the man he once was, and that he needs to go back to the magic world to make right what he has done. The Shadowpact are called on to join him on his quest and provide a way for him to reach Sorcerers' World.

Generation Lost
Captain Atom appears as one of the central characters in Justice League: Generation Lost, a maxi-series that takes place during the wider Brightest Day event. At the start of the series, Captain Atom is recruited as part of a massive group of superheroes tasked with hunting down the JLI's founder and Ted Kord's murderer, Maxwell Lord. During an encounter with Max at the Justice League's former New York headquarters, Captain Atom is rendered unconscious alongside Fire, Ice, and Booster Gold. The former Justice League members awake to discover that Lord has used his mental abilities to erase his existence from the minds of every single human on the planet, save for those present at the embassy. and the others. Afterwards, Captain Atom discovers that Max has mentally influenced the US army into believing that he had betrayed them.

Captain Atom shares with the group that when he absorbed a nuclear bomb Max had set off, he found himself thrown through time to the future of 24th century, an Earth that had fallen into chaos through metahuman wars and backward in technology. Atom found a woman elderly and grotesque, who turned out to be an aged Power Girl, telling him it was Maxwell Lord who was responsible for all of this. Atom is then pulled back into the present, and tells the rest of the team that the world needs them to stop the instigated Max.

After discovering that the OMACs had dismembered a droid, Captain Atom was struck by Magog who simply scoffs at the notion and states that he has come to kill Captain Atom at the behest of Max. In their battle, Captain Atom manages to convince Magog he is being manipulated by Max. Magog stops the attacks as he remembers Max's existence and Captain Atom is prepared to help him. However, Max is on hand and forces Magog to kill himself with his spear. Max uses his powers to manipulate everyone into believing that Captain Atom has killed Magog before leaving. Captain Atom realizes Magog's spear is about to explode with energy. Captain Atom tries to absorb as much as he can, thrusting him into the time stream again as a crater is left behind.

Captain Atom is propelled through time again to 112 years in the future, where a metahuman war against the OMACs had devastated the planet. Captain Atom battled for survival alongside the future versions of the Justice League, but they all are eventually contaminated by a new nanovirus version of the OMACs and one by one become OMACs themselves. As a dying Power Girl tells him that the catalyst for all this was the death of Wonder Woman by Max's hands, Captain Atom is returned into the present but not before Batman orders him to terminate the OMAC project to stop Max's plan.

During the final battle against the new OMAC known as OMAC Prime, Captain Atom allows OMAC Prime to absorb his energy, before reabsorbing the energy and overloading his powers, resulting in him being thrown into the time stream once again. Just before this occurred, Captain Atom grabbed Max and threatened to pull him into the time stream as well, unless Max undid the global mindwipe of his existence. Max complied and everyone on the planet had their memories of him restored before Captain Atom was pulled away to a time and space unknown. Max later released a statement onto the internet exonerating Captain Atom of the deaths in Chicago, saying far worse would have happened if he had not intervened.

The New 52
In The New 52 reboot of  DC's continuity, Captain Atom is reintroduced with altered powers, appearance and origin. He is still USAF pilot Nathaniel Adam. In the new reality, Adam volunteers to participate in an experiment conducted by a research facility called the Continuum. At this facility, Dr. Megala's research is focused on the quantum field and on "dimensional transfer through M Theory". Adam is asked to pilot the dimensional-transfer vessel by Dr. Megala, who is now presented as a particle physicist working out of Colorado, but is seemingly atomized during the experiment. Soon afterwards, he reappears, now an energy-based life form. According to Dr. Megala, Captain Atom's abilities are largely nuclear in nature and involve tapping into the strong nuclear force, the energy that binds protons and neutrons in the nucleus. Adam's physical atoms are constantly splitting apart, giving him incredible power. His body maintains integrity by instantly re-merging these atoms, but extreme use of his powers can interfere with this process and cause Captain Atom's form to become unstable. This leads to a fear that at some point Captain Atom's brain might lose its molecular stability and he will not be able to fix it before it impairs his consciousness or causes him to suffer some form of brain death.

In the new reality, Nathaniel Adam has been only Captain Atom for a few months and is still exploring his abilities, constantly learning new facets to them such as his ability to perceive wireless transmissions from cell phones and computers. He frequently returns to the Continuum so that Dr. Megala and the staff can help him further understand his abilities and occasionally so they can stabilize his body when he seems to be having problems. The world at large looks on Captain Atom with suspicion due to uncertainty about his agenda and the nature of his abilities. Some fear that he is leaking radiation and potentially poisoning those he comes into contact with. Several have remarked that the Justice League may have rejected Captain Atom for membership due to suspicion of how dangerous he is. Despite this, Nathaniel chooses to try and use his powers to help others on Earth, clandestinely if need be. During a fight with Megala, who had taken control of Firestorm's body, Atom is forced to absorb a massive amount of energy released which splits his molecules apart into the timestream. One of these pieces is found in the 31st Century, where he names himself Nathaniel Adym. Adym had become an agent of Echo, a covert branch of the Science Police assigned to monitor the timestream. As part of his duties, he had interacted with members of the Legion of Super-Heroes stranded in the past, in Legion Lost, along with his subordinates Agent Jocelyn Lure and Agent Yera Allon. Adym is last seen escaping the threat of his own singularity bomb, launching himself into the past.

DC Rebirth: The Fall and Rise of Captain Atom

Captain Atom (Nathaniel Adam) lost control of his powers and caused a devastating accident in this six-issue series set in 2012. Needing to contain his unstable abilities, he went into Dr. Megala's Subterranean Suppression Dome but seemingly exploded. The world believed Nathaniel Adam was killed in a blast; However, Adam took a subatomic trip through time and ended up without powers, 20 years in the past. It is revealed that the quantum blowback sent him back in time to 1994 as a normal man.  Adam's wound distorted after being shot during an attempted car robbery, and his body was encased in liquid metal. As a result of the time stream correcting itself, he was thrown back to 2017.

Powers and abilities
Powers
In the Post-Crisis DC Comics Universe, Captain Atom's Dilustel skin is tied into the Quantum Field, which enables him to absorb and manipulate theoretically infinite amounts of energy, limited by only his willpower and imagination. This energy can be used for flight (which is generally faster than the speed of sound in Earth's atmosphere and up to half-light speed in the vacuum of space), super strength (shown at times to be on par with Martian Manhunter, though another sourcethe DC Heroes Roleplaying Gamedefines his level of strength second only to Superman's among the heroes of the DC Universe, though as Monarch he was capable of effortlessly overwhelming three versions of Superman), durability (he has survived exploding nuclear weapons, and even energy sufficient to wipe out all life within the Universe of Earth 51although this was his own energy), self-sustenance and life support (allowing him to live and even speak in space), and controlling energy of any form. In addition to high speed flight he has been shown to possess enhanced reflexes. Atom's abilities stem from his link to the Quantum Field, which provides a virtually infinite source of Quantum Energy, which can be used for a vast number of effects. He commonly manipulates his energy into force field bubbles, or explosive "bombs", but the most common form is a simple energy blast. Atom has been shown to be capable of manipulating even exotic energies such as magic, and has a high degree of resistance to such attacks.

Over the years, Captain Atom has become an expert at energy manipulation and he can fire energy blasts from any point on his body, although he usually uses his hands for better aim. He can fire in multiple directions at once or from every point of his body at once. Several times he has "detonated", releasing a massive amount of energy at once, destroying objects within a certain radius, as demonstrated by his destruction of Bludhaven. On more than one occasion, he has used his ability to manipulate all forms of energy to prevent a foe using their own powers, such as the Ray and Firestorm.

If Atom absorbs too much energy at once, the energy transports him uncontrollably through time. Depending on the type of energy absorbed, he either goes forward or backward in time, though he also possesses the ability to voluntarily move forward in the time-stream. Captain Atom states that through concentration, he can briefly travel ahead in time ("about a week or so"). The process is exhausting and the period he can interact in the future appears to be limited to a few minutes before he returns to the present. In the case of involuntary quantum jumping, he is typically shown as being stuck in the time-stream for as long as it takes his body to process any absorbed energy.

Captain Atom can also convert energy to matter in the same manner he manipulates energy. Originally, he needed a pair of gloves invented by the Blue Beetle to do so, but he has since learned to do so without them. He is capable of manipulating matter on an atomic or sub-atomic level at a limited scale. He has used his atomic transmutation powers to turn both Maul and the Engineer back to their human forms. This power can be used instinctively or through concentration, though Atom has conceded he is not very good at it. In the same way, he learned to access weak force energy. As a consequence of his energy manipulation abilities, he is able to telepathically interface with computer networks. He has on occasion used this to repel telepathic intrusions by downloading information directly into other telepaths. With focus and effort, Captain Atom can increase any of his abilities to match his current willpower, up to an unknown level. As Monarch prior to absorbing the Captain Atom Brigade his powers and abilities were increased to such a level that he was capable of effortlessly containing several versions of powerful heroes such as Superman, Wonder Woman and several Green Lanterns.

Atom has shown the capacity to absorb matter, as well as energytypified by his absorption of the Captain Atom Brigade. As Monarch he possessed all of his inherent abilitiesat much higher levelsas well as teleportation, and awareness of and access to different realities. He was capable of storing enough energy, that upon its release, was capable of wiping all life from the alternate Earth 51except for its Monitor and a single plant.

Later writers and editors have introduced a radioactive aspect of Captain Atom's physical makeup. This seems to contradict the quantum nature of Atom's powers as originally introduced, as he previously did not emit radiation when his skin was cut open. Towards the end of his series' run, it was speculated that Captain Atom is an Elemental (Quantum Elemental) along with the Swamp Thing (Earth), the Red Tornado (Air), Firestorm (Fire), and Naiad (Water).

In addition to his superhuman abilities, Nathaniel Adam is also an experienced United States Air Force pilot. It is notable that he is one of the few superheroes with a "Captain" appellation that corresponds to a military rank he has actually held. He is especially skilled in combat piloting, is trained in military weaponry, strategy, and hand-to-hand combat and speaks multiple languages, including Russian. Adam also has strong survival instincts derived from his experiences during the Vietnam War.

Dilustel
Captain Atom's metallic shell, or "skin", is composed of a portion of the alien being known as Silver Shield, and is called Dilustel. Pieces of the alien's metal body were used in Project Atom, and on later subjects like Major Force and Bombshell. Nathaniel is able to coat himself with the metal, either partially or totally. Atom's symbiosis with the metal is such that even partially armored he is able to access the Quantum Field. The metal is almost indestructible, resistant to various degrees of damage from energy, heat, lasers, etc. Only X-Ionizer technology can cut the metal, as established when the Captain Atom Project uses it to remove the Silver Shield's skin. The katana wielded by the "Cambodian" that once sliced through Atom's side was also X-Ionized. The magical guns of the Crimson Avenger were able to crack his skin. Breaking through it causes Captain Atom to Quantum Jump as if he has absorbed too much energy.

X-Ionizer
The X-Ionizer is a hardening technology invented by the specialists of Project Atom, introduced in the Cary Bates run of the DC Comics published Captain Atom. Because of the nearly invulnerable nature of the alien metal discovered, the scientists needed some way to cut it to perform experiments. Doctor Heinrich Megala, one of the lead researchers of the Project, developed a device that would make the molecular lattices of an object by knitting together positive & negative ion particles in such a way that it became superdense and compact. This, in effect, makes the object nearly indestructible. Also, any edge on an X-Ionized object would attain the sharpness of a monofilament, enabling both it and its user to cut finer and cleaner than the most advanced blade or laser. Once transformed, the object would then be able to cut through virtually any material, including the Dilustel (quantum metal) skin of the Silver Shield which was used to empower Captain Atom, Major Force, and Bombshell. A mercenary known as the Cambodian wore a suit of X-Ionized armor, and uses an X-ionized katana to cut through Captain Atom's skin in Captain Atom #7. A famous physicist and former C.I.A operative, turned dangerous cult leader and quantum powered supervillain called 'The Ghost' theorized that properties hardened and honed by such a device undergo a form of mantling taking on properties very similar to the extra-dimensional biometal belonging to the Silver Shield entity.

DC Rebirth
After DC Rebirth, Captain Atom is restored to his Post-Crisis powers. His New 52 powers have seemingly disappeared.

Former powers
His former drastically altered New 52 powers are a being whose atoms are constantly splitting and then reforming just as quickly, releasing massive amounts of energy. This surplus of power can be manipulated in a number of ways such as flight and the ability to transmute physical matter. Captain Atom has been seen to transform lava into snow by willing it and has been able to remove cancer from a human being. He can also absorb massive amounts of energy.

Captain Atom's abilities are largely nuclear in nature and involve tapping into the strong nuclear force, the energy that binds protons and neutrons in the nucleus. Excessive or intense use of his abilities has resulted in Captain Atom temporarily losing his own molecular stability. It is not yet known if he will be able to conquer this weakness with practice.

As an energy-based life form, Captain Atom's senses now operate on different levels than a normal person. He is able to sense and perceive radio signals, cell phone signals and other similar transmissions. He can also see the energy of certain molecules, such as when he notes the energy signature of the Flash and remarks that his molecules seem to be sparking with fire or lightning. He also does not need air, food or water to survive.

Rogues gallery
Captain Atom has his own enemies:
 Bolt (Larry Bolatinsky): An assassin and mercenary sporting an electrokinetic suit hired by General Eiling for a number of militia hero sales schemes. Often came in conflict with Captain Atom over the course of his military career while under contract in another of many government staged publicity stunts.
 Doctor Spectro (Tom Emery): A scientist driven mad by his emotion-altering prisms, Dr. Spectro gained the ability to affect emotions directly. Post-Crisis, Spectro was a small-time crook General Wade Eiling used to create a cover story for Captain Atom. Very bright costumes were a characteristic of Dr. Spectro.Green Arrow #46 Doctor Spectro first appeared in Captain Atom #79 as the first supervillain anatagonist of the titular hero, and was created by Steve Ditko and Joe Gill. The character first appeared in Charlton Comics, later in DC Comics. James Sandy counted Doctor Spectro among the many comic characters that were introduced in the Silver Age of Comic Books and disappeared again after a short run, but authors of The Superhero Book found him a unique supervillain.
 Fiery-Icer: A mercenary with a suit that unleashes intense fire from his right gauntlet and frigid cold from the left, the mysterious Fiery-Icer fought Captain Atom on several occasions.
 General Wade Eiling: Once his commanding officer in the military who even in his new identity Nathaniel Adam often butted heads with due to his unscrupulous means of promoting America's new military assets. Unknown to the Captain for the longest time, it was the corrupt general who had Adam framed for killing a senior officer which, in turn, subjected him to the Atom Project years ago.
 The Ghost (Alec Rois): A physicist who developed a teleportation device that he used to become a millionaire, Alec Rois took on the persona of the Ghost and became Captain Atom and his partner Nightshade's Pre-Crisis nemesis. Post-Crisis, he was a cult leader nicknamed the Faceless One, a disgruntled weapons developer and a former CIA operative who sought revenge against an unscrupulous employer. Having been trapped in the Quantum Field by his own Stealthray tech, he is released as an energy being who controls teletranslocation through it and has connections to Atom's past conviction while enlisted five years ago.
 Iron Arms: A mercenary that employs a backpack that powers powerful cybernetic arms.
 The Cambodian (Rako): An arms dealer and personal enforcer of the Post-Crisis Ghost. A survivor of a U.S. bombing raid during the Vietnam War, this Cambodian refugee was taken into Rois' services while he was a government agent. Acting as the Green Elite's hitman, Rako framed Nathaniel Adam for treason under Rois' orders, resulting in his drafting into Project: Atom. As the Cambodian, he would clad himself in armor and weaponry tempered by the X-Ionizer, wielding a skein sharp enough to pierce Captain Atom's Dilustel armor.
 Major Force (Clifford Zmeck): A rapist/murderer exposed to the same experiment that created Captain Atom, he would regularly betray the U.S. government or go back to work for their more clandestine, i.e., crooked, organizations, becoming a regular as Captain Atom's Post-Crisis nemesis.
 Monarch (Hank Hall): In an alternate future, Hank Hall goes mad and kills Earth's heroes to conquer the world. When the hero Waverider comes back in time to prevent this, he instead creates the paradox that made his future possible. When Monarch goes back in time to retrieve his past self, it was Captain Atom that failed to stop him. Captain Atom battled the villain through time to quell the guilt of his failure to stop him earlier.
 Plastique (Bette Sans Souci): A French terrorist with explosive-based powers and intense separatist designs, first came in contact with Captain Atom during an assassination attempt at a Canadian/American peace delegation. The two frequently clash with one another, eventually falling in love and entering into a whirlwind marriage, albeit a short-lived one.
 Punch and Jewelee: A husband and wife team of villains who work as thieves and mercenaries. Post-Crisis, they instead fought King Faraday and Nightshade.
 Thirteen: In reality a federal agent from Earth's future, Thirteen travels back in time with his partner Faustus, a talking cat, to prevent the Ghost from stealing an experimental missile and end up facing Captain Atom. He appears to be a sorcerer but it is unknown if he employs magic or science.
 Ultramax''': Former assassin turned death row inmate in the early 2000s, when Atom had his meltdown and was catapulted into the Q-Field. Max Thrane, as he was facing the electric chair at the time, was bathed in the fallout during his execution. About a decade later, Captain Atom would return and undo his predicament, only for him to awake finding he had gained similar Quantum Powers due to the hero's blowback years ago, to which, now going by the name Ultramax, Thrane set out on a path of revenge against the one who slated him for his death sentence.

Other versions
Armageddon 2001

An alternate future Captain Atom is featured prominently in the 1991 series Armageddon 2001. A tragedy drives him insane and he uses his powers in vengeance. This also triggers a chain of events which brings Monarch to the present 'time'.

Kingdom Come

Captain Atom appears briefly in flashback sequences of Alex Ross and Mark Waid's 1996 miniseries Kingdom Come, printed under DC Comics' Elseworlds imprint. His death at the hands of the villain the Parasite, and the irradiation of Kansas this caused, results in Superman's return to action and sets the events of the story into motion. His outfit in this comic is a combination of his original Charlton uniform and his later DC costume. The Kingdom Come universe established and created by Waid and Ross would later be introduced to DC canon in the form of Earth-22. The Silver Age Captain Atom appears in the sequel The Kingdom: Planet Krypton #1 as one of the "ghosts" in the empty "Planet Krypton" restaurant.

Breach

In 2004, DC launched an ongoing series called Breach. The series was originally planned as a revamp of the Captain Atom concept, but Breach was subsequently re-conceived as a completely new character. The 2005 mini-series Infinite Crisis revealed that Breach would have been a native of Earth-Eight if the Multiverse had continued to exist after Crisis on Infinite Earths as his world's counterpart to Captain Atom. The 2007 series Countdown: Arena at first suggests that a new Breach was created on the Earth-8 of the new Multiverse, although whether this indeed happened is called into question when the Breach featured in the miniseries is revealed to be the same mainstream Breach featured in the eponymous limited series. Breach is killed when absorbed into Monarch in the last issue of Countdown: Arena.

52 Multiverse

In the final issue of 52, a new Multiverse is revealed, originally consisting of 52 identical realities. Among the parallel realities shown is one designated "Earth-4". As a result of Mister Mind "eating" aspects of this reality, it takes on visual aspects similar to the pre-Crisis Earth-4, including Captain Atom and the other Charlton characters. The names of the characters are not mentioned in the panel in which they appear, but the Captain Atom is visually similar to Charlton's original version of the character. According to comments by Grant Morrison, this alternate universe is not the pre-Crisis Earth-4.

2007's Countdown: Arena features Captains Atom from alternate universes. The combatants of the series are introduced as a new Breach of Earth-8, a Ronnie Raymond/Nathaniel Adam fusion called "Quantum-Storm" from Earth-37, and another from Earth-38 who rules over his Atomic Knights. Additionally, issue #1 introduces a "Brigadier Atom" from Earth-13 married to Nightshade, and in Countdown: Arena #3, Breach gathers together a group of alternate Captains Atom, including Earth-13's Brigadier, the Captain Atom as depicted in the graphic novel Kingdom Come (Earth-22), and a Captain in a red/silver variant of the Monarch's costume, one similar to the Charlton Comics Atom (Earth-4), and a Hulked-out variant named Attum from an unknown Earth. Several more variants are shown in Countdown: Arena #4, including a President Atom, a robot called Quantum Mechanix, Kid Quantum of the Legion of Super-Heroes, Captain Adamma, Quantum Boy, an anthropomorphic wolf version, a Soviet Atom from Earth-30, a Doctor Manhattan-lookalike, an energy based-Atom who makes calculations during his attacks, and a giant-sized actual atom. Grant Morrison's Final Crisis: Superman Beyond 3D (2008) depicts a Captain Allen Adam from Earth-4, a cross between the original Charlton version, Superman, Reed Richards and Doctor Manhattan. The DC Multiverse is refreshed following Flashpoint, but this last Grant Morrison-created Captain Atom is a main character in the 2016 comic The Multiversity – Pax Americana (2015).

Flashpoint

In the alternate timeline of the Flashpoint storyline, Nathaniel Adam is a general who never went through with the  experiment, and is consequently much older than in the original timeline. General Adam controls the body and physical actions of Project Six's body, using it to attack Booster Gold, believing him to be an Atlantean threat. During the battle, General Adam's control link is destroyed by metahuman interference, causing Project Six's true personality to surface. General Adam loses control of Project Six, but Booster fixes the control link. General Adam then attempts to use the link to kill Booster Gold. Fortunately, General Adam takes Booster Gold back to the base for interrogation, allowing Booster Gold to escape when the sight of "Project Superman" causes Project Six's true personality to resurface again with the damage caused by the attack, causing the ceiling to collapse on General Adam, who is knocked unconscious.

Final Crisis

In Earth-4 of the DC Multiverse, Captain Atom's counterpart, Captain Adam, known as the Quantum Superman, is shown to exist. He is seemingly similar to Doctor Manhattan in many ways, having the iconic hydrogen atom symbol on his forehead and having bright blue skin which emits Cherenkov radiation, just like Doctor Manhattan's skin. However, he constantly needs to use drugs to keep his humanity, otherwise he risks turning uncontrollably powerful and emotionless just like Doctor Manhattan (although the latter can feel emotions), but he is still unable to become stronger than Doctor Manhattan even without his drugs.

Dr. Manhattan

The rights to Captain Atom and most other Charlton characters were purchased by DC Comics in the early 1980s. Originally, these Charlton characters were to be reintroduced in writer Alan Moore's limited series Watchmen, but this would render the characters unusable for future stories. Thus new characters, inspired by the Charlton originals, were used instead."Watchmen – Introduction"  —  An overview of the plot and characters in Watchmen. Retrieved 12 March 2006. Watchmens Doctor Manhattan is based on Captain Atom, and like Captain Atom, gained similar powers through a similar scientific mishap.

In other media
Television
 Captain Atom appears in Justice League Unlimited, voiced by George Eads in "Initiation" and by Chris Cox in all subsequent episodes. This version has a slight Texas accent and is a disembodied mass of energy contained in a special suit with a limit to how much energy he can absorb, which will cause him to explode like a nuclear bomb if exceeded. In his most notable appearance, "Question Authority", General Wade Eiling reactivates his Air Force commission and orders him to keep the Question in Project Cadmus' custody. Captain Atom fights Superman, but is defeated and brought back to the Watchtower.
 Captain Atom appears in Young Justice, voiced by Michael T. Weiss. This version is a member of the Justice League. In season two, he becomes the leader of the League before handing over leadership to Black Canary by the season finale.
 Captain Atom appears in the Batman: The Brave and the Bold episode "Powerless!", voiced by Brian Bloom. This version, also known as Allen Adams and Cameron Scott, is an arrogant and egocentric hero and member of Justice League International who is fond of making public service announcements and looks down on heroes without superpowers.

Film
 Captain Atom appears in Superman/Batman: Public Enemies, voiced by Xander Berkeley. This version works for the U.S. government under President Lex Luthor and leads a group of government-sanctioned heroes.
 Captain Atom makes a brief appearance in Justice League: The Flashpoint Paradox, voiced by Lex Lang. This version is a member of the Justice League. Additionally, the Flashpoint incarnation of Captain Atom makes an appearance, during which he was captured by the Atlanteans and forced to power Aquaman's doomsday device.
 Captain Atom appears in Injustice, voiced by Fred Tatasciore.
 The Allen Adam incarnation of Captain Atom appears in DC Showcase: Blue Beetle, voiced by Jeff Bennett.

Miscellaneous
Captain Atom appears in the Injustice: Gods Among us prequel comics. He joins Batman's Insurgency to combat Superman's growing Regime. While on a mission to retrieve an enhancement pill from the Fortress of Solitude, Captain Atom fights Superman, admitting that he was chosen by the government to kill the latter should he go rogue. Before the former can decide whether to follow his orders, Wonder Woman intervenes, slashing Captain Atom's containment suit. He drags Superman to the atmosphere in the hopes of taking the latter with him, with Wonder Woman in pursuit. The subsequent explosion leaves Captain Atom dead and Wonder Woman in a coma, but Superman survives.

Collected editions

References

External links
 DCU Guide
 
 
Captain Atom (1960) and Captain Atom (1986) at Don Markstein's Toonopedia. *Archived (1960) and Archived (1986) from the originals on April 9, 2012.
 Captain Atom (DC Comics)'' at the Big Comic Book DataBase
 International Catalogue of Superheroes entry for Captain Atom
 Captain Atom historical sales figures at The Comics Chronicles

Characters created by Cary Bates
Characters created by Joe Gill
Characters created by Pat Broderick
Characters created by Steve Ditko
Comics characters introduced in 1960
Comics characters introduced in 1987
Comics by Steve Ditko
DC Comics American superheroes
DC Comics characters who can move at superhuman speeds
DC Comics characters with accelerated healing
DC Comics characters with superhuman senses
DC Comics characters with superhuman strength
DC Comics metahumans
DC Comics military personnel
DC Comics scientists
Fictional aviators
Fictional characters with absorption or parasitic abilities
Fictional characters with elemental transmutation abilities
Fictional characters with nuclear or radiation abilities
Fictional characters with superhuman durability or invulnerability
Fictional characters with energy-manipulation abilities
Fictional government agents
Fictional military captains
Fictional nuclear physicists
Fictional super soldiers
Fictional United States Air Force personnel
Fictional people from the 20th-century